Sentimental is a 1981 Argentine crime film directed by and starring Sergio Renán. It was entered into the 12th Moscow International Film Festival.

Cast
 Sergio Renán as José Solari
 Pepe Soriano as Tano Piatti
 Ulises Dumont as Atilio Pécora
 Luisina Brando as China
 Alicia Bruzzo as Ginette
 Enrique Pinti as Franklin "Frankie" Viqueira 
 Silvia Kutika as Fabiana

References

External links
 

1981 films
1980s crime films
Argentine crime drama films
1980s Spanish-language films
Films directed by Sergio Renán
1980s Argentine films